Sir Robert William Miller is a former chief of Emap, (East Midlands Allied Press), and more recently, a former chairman of HMV, taking over from Eric Nicoli . He has held and still holds many executive and non-executive positions. He received a knighthood in the June 2003 Queen’s birthday Honours list.

Career highlights
 1965, started in Emap as a junior reporter.
 1998, appointed non-executive chairman of Emap plc. 
 2001, returned as Chief Executive of Emap plc.
 2004, appointed non-executive director and chairman of HMV, effective 2 February 2004.
 2005, HMV announced in July of this year that Sir Robin was standing down to “pursue other commitments”. 
 2005, appointed non-executive chairman of Edge Performance VCT plc.

Other positions
 Non-executive director of Channel 4 Television until 2005 .
 Chairman of Sport England (Eastern Division) .
 Non-executive director (1998–2001) of Moss Bros plc 
 Non-executive director of the Tote. 
 Chairman of music publisher Boosey & Hawkes.
 Member of the WPBSA Board .
 Non-Executive Chairman of digitalbox ltd.

References
  BBC news
  HMV group media information
  timesonline.co.uk
  The Guardian
  Hansard
  BBC sport
  digitalbox ltd.

British media executives
Businesspeople awarded knighthoods
Knights Bachelor
Living people
Year of birth missing (living people)